Strictly Powell is a studio album by jazz pianist Bud Powell, released in 1957 by RCA Victor, featuring a session Powell recorded in 1956.

The album was remastered and released on CD by BMG Japan in 1994, and re-issued by RCA in 1995. The session is also available on The Complete RCA Trio Sessions.

History
This is the first of Powell's two sessions for RCA Victor. There are four new Powell compositions (not counting "Elegy" which two weeks previously had been recorded as "Elogie" for his final Verve session, released on Blues in the Closet), and in the original LP liner notes Leonard Feather marks out "Blues for Bessie" as "the most remarkable ... a completely spontaneous improvisation from start to finish". Concerning "Elegy", Feather notes that it "scales up and down little ladders of fourths".

Track listing
All songs were written by Bud Powell, except where noted.
"There Will Never Be Another You" (Harry Warren, Mack Gordon) – 3:39
"Coscrane" – 3:44
"Over the Rainbow" (Harold Arlen, E.Y. "Yip" Harburg) – 3:20
"Blues for Bessie" – 5:40
"Time Was" (aka "Duerme" «Sleep») (Miguel Prado, Gabriel Luna, Bob Russell) – 3:07

"Topsy Turvy" – 4:36
"Lush Life" (Billy Strayhorn) – 2:53
"Elegy" (aka "Elogie" and "Elegie") – 3:49
"They Didn't Believe Me" (Jerome Kern) – 3:18
"I Cover the Waterfront" (Johnny Green, Edward Heyman) – 2:32
"Jump City" – 3:21

Personnel

Performance
October 5, 1956, New York. The Bud Powell Trio.
Bud Powell – piano
George Duvivier – bass
Art Taylor – drums

Production
Burt Goldblatt – cover design & photo 
Ikuyoshi Hirakawa – producer (1994 CD release)
Leonard Feather – liner notes
Cliff Preiss – liner notes (1995 CD release)
Tohru Kotetsu – remastering (1994 CD release)

References

Bud Powell albums
1957 albums
RCA Victor albums